Szczutowo  is a village in Sierpc County, Masovian Voivodeship, in east-central Poland. It is the seat of the gmina (administrative district) called Gmina Szczutowo.

References

Szczutowo